George Herbert Gerken (July 28, 1903 – October 23, 1977) nicknamed "Pickels", was a Major League Baseball outfielder who played for two seasons. He played for the Cleveland Indians for six games in 1927 and 38 games in 1928.

External links

1903 births
1977 deaths
Major League Baseball outfielders
Cleveland Indians players
Baseball players from Illinois
Nashville Vols players